Raúl Blanco (born 4 December 1941) is an Argentine-born Australian Association football coach and former player.

Blanco was born in Buenos Aires. He is well known for coaching the Socceroos from March 1998 to June 1999. He was also coaching the Olyroos (Under-23 side) at the same time, and coached them during the 2000 Summer Olympics. Blanco was also employed by New Zealand Football as a technical assistant in their successful campaign to qualify for the 2010 FIFA World Cup in South Africa while coaching Macarthur Rams.

A defender, Blanco played for Argentine football club Arsenal de Sarandí between 1962 and 1966, he then immigrated to Australia where he played for Prague F.C. between 1968 and 1971 and Pan-Hellenic between 1972 and 1973.

References

External links
 ozfootball.net Profile
 
 

Living people
1941 births
Australian soccer coaches
Australia national soccer team managers
Argentine emigrants to Australia
Argentine footballers
Arsenal de Sarandí footballers
Sydney FC Prague players
Footballers from Buenos Aires
Sydney Olympic FC players
Parramatta FC managers
Association football defenders